Twin pagodas may refer to:

 Twin Pagoda Temple, in Taiyuan, Shanxi province, China
 Twin Pagodas in Suzhou, Jiangsu, China
 Twin Pagodas of Qingshou Temple, formerly standing in Beijing, China
 Twin Pagodas at Baisikou, in Helan County, Ningxia, China